The fifth generation era (also known as the 32-bit era, the 64-bit era, or the 3D era) refers to computer and video games, video game consoles, and handheld gaming consoles dating from approximately February 20, 1993, to March 23, 2006. For home consoles, the best-selling console was the Sony PlayStation, followed by the Nintendo 64, and then the Sega Saturn. The PlayStation also had a redesigned version, the PSone, which was launched on July 7, 2000.

Some features that distinguished fifth generation consoles from previous fourth generation consoles include:
 3D polygon graphics with texture mapping
 3D graphics capabilities – lighting, Gouraud shading, anti-aliasing and texture filtering
 Optical disc (CD-ROM) game storage, allowing much larger storage space (up to 650 MB) than ROM cartridges
 CD quality audio recordings (music and speech) – PCM audio with 16-bit depth and 44.1 kHz sampling rate
 Wide adoption of full motion video, displaying pre-rendered computer animation or live action footage
 Analog controllers
 Display resolutions from 480i/480p to 576i
 Color depth up to 16,777,216 colors (24-bit true color)

This era is known for its pivotal role in the video game industry's leap from 2D to 3D computer graphics, as well as the shift in home console games from being stored on ROM cartridges to optical discs.  This was also the first generation to feature internet connectivity: some systems had additional hardware which provided connectivity to an existing device, like the Sega Net Link for the Sega Saturn. The Apple Pippin, a commercial flop, was the first system to feature on-board internet capabilities.

For handhelds, this era was characterized by significant fragmentation, because the first handheld of the generation, the Sega Nomad, had a lifespan of just two years, and the Nintendo Virtual Boy had a lifespan of less than one. Both of them were discontinued before the other handhelds made their debut. The Neo Geo Pocket was released on October 28, 1998, but was dropped by SNK in favor of the fully backwards-compatible Neo Geo Pocket Color just a year later. Nintendo's Game Boy Color (1998) was the most successful handheld by a large margin. There were also two minor updates of the original Game Boy: the Game Boy Light (released in Japan only) and the Game Boy Pocket.

There was considerable time overlap between this generation and the next, the sixth generation of consoles, which began with the launch of the Dreamcast in Japan on November 27, 1998. The fifth generation ended with the discontinuation of the PlayStation (specifically its re-engineered form, the "PSOne") on March 23, 2006, a year after the launch of the seventh generation.

History

Transition to 3D

The 32-bit/64-bit era is most noted for the rise of fully 3D polygon games. While there were games prior that had used three-dimensional polygon environments, such as Virtua Racing and Virtua Fighter in the arcades and Star Fox on the Super NES, it was in this era that many game designers began to move traditionally 2D and pseudo-3D genres into 3D on video game consoles. Early efforts from then-industry leaders Sega and Nintendo saw the introduction of the 32X and Super FX, which provided rudimentary 3D capabilities to the 16-bit Genesis and Super NES. Starting in 1996, 3D video games began to take off with releases such as Virtua Fighter 2 on the Saturn, Tomb Raider on the PlayStation and Saturn, Tekken 2 and Crash Bandicoot on the PlayStation, and Super Mario 64 on the Nintendo 64. Their 3D environments were widely marketed and they steered the industry's focus away from side-scrolling and rail-style titles, as well as opening doors to more complex games and genres. 3D became the main focus in this era as well as a slow decline of cartridges in favor of CDs, due to the ability to produce games less expensively and the media's high storage capabilities.

CD vs cartridge

After allowing Sony to develop a CD-based prototype console for them and a similar failed partnership with Philips, Nintendo decided to make the Nintendo 64 a cartridge-based system like its predecessors. Publicly, Nintendo defended this decision on the grounds that it would give games shorter load times than a compact disc (and would decrease piracy due to a certain chip in the ROM cartridge).  However, it also had the dubious benefit of allowing Nintendo to charge higher licensing fees, as cartridge production was considerably more expensive than CD production. Many third-party developers like EA Sports viewed this as an underhanded attempt to raise more money for Nintendo and many of them became more reluctant to release games on the N64.

Nintendo's decision to use a cartridge based system sparked a small scale war among gamers as to which was better. The chief advantages of the CD-ROM format were (1) larger storage capacity, allowing for a much greater amount of game content; (2) considerably lower manufacturing costs, making them much less risky for game publishers; (3) lower retail prices due to the reduced need to compensate for manufacturing costs; and (4) shorter production times, which greatly reduced the need for publishers to predict the demand for a game. Its disadvantages compared to cartridge were (1) considerable load times; (2) their inability to load data "on the fly", making them reliant on the console RAM; and (3) the greater manufacturing costs of CD-ROM drives compared to cartridge slots, resulting in generally higher retail prices for CD-based consoles. A Nintendo Power ad placed a Space Shuttle (representing cartridges) next to a snail (representing a CD), as an analogy for their respective speeds, stating that "the future doesn't belong to snails".

Almost every other contemporary system used the new CD-ROM technology (the Nintendo 64 was the last major home video game console to use cartridges, until the Nintendo Switch in 2017). Consequent to the storage and cost advantages of the CD-ROM format, many game developers shifted their support away from the Nintendo 64 to the PlayStation. One of the most influential game franchises to change consoles during this era was the Final Fantasy series, beginning with Final Fantasy VII, which was originally being developed for the N64 but due to storage capacity issues was shifted to and released on the PlayStation; prior Final Fantasy games had all been published on Nintendo consoles – either the NES or Super NES, with the only other entries being on the Wonderswan, or computers like the MSX.

Overview of the fifth generation consoles
The fifth generation was characterized by a highly fragmented market. More competing consoles comprised this generation than any other since the video game crash of 1983, leading video game magazines of the time to frequently predict a second crash.

Major consoles
The 3DO Interactive Multiplayer was one of the earliest fifth generation consoles and was released in October 1993. Despite having massive third-party support and an unprecedented amount of hype for a first-time entrant into the industry, it had early difficulties due to software development delays and its high price. For its initial release, the 3DO had a $700 retail price tag and only a single available game ready for market. The 3DO would be discontinued only three years later. While generally regarded as a failed system, the 3DO was this generation's fourth best selling console in a crowded field with sales of 2 million units.

The Sega Saturn was Sega's entry into the stand-alone 32-bit console market. It was released in Japan simultaneously with the 32X in November 1994, although it wouldn't have a North American release until six months later. It became Sega's most successful console in Japan. In America and Europe however, a disastrous launch and an MSRP of $399 compared to the PlayStation's $299 caused it to be a commercial failure, selling far fewer units than the Master System and Mega Drive/Genesis before it.

The PlayStation, released in early December 1994, was the most successful console of this generation. With attention given by third-party developers and a more mature marketing campaign aimed at the 20–30 age group enabling it to achieve market dominance, it became the first home console to ship 100 million units worldwide.

The Nintendo 64, originally announced as the "Ultra 64", was released in 1996. The system's delays and use of the expensive cartridge format made it an unpopular platform among third-party developers. Several popular 1st party titles allowed the Nintendo 64 to maintain strong sales in the United States, but it remained a distant second to the PlayStation.

Other consoles
The FM Towns Marty is considered the world's first 32-bit console, although it has only 16bit data bus (predating the Amiga CD32 and 3DO, which are both fully 32bit), being released on February 20, 1993, by Japanese electronic company Fujitsu. Never released outside Japan, it was largely marketed as a console version of the FM Towns home computer, being compatible with games developed for the FM Towns. It failed to make an impact in the marketplace due to its relative expense and inability to compete with home computers.

The Amiga CD32 was released in September 1993 and sold in Europe, Australia, Canada and Brazil. It was never released in the United States due to Commodore's bankruptcy and court-ordered import restrictions. Despite promising initial sales, the console was hampered by poor software quality with many titles being simply re-releases of older games. Production of the Amiga CD32 was discontinued after only eight months.

The Atari Jaguar was released in November 1993 and was marketed as the world's first 64-bit system. However, sales at launch were well below the incumbent fourth generation consoles, and a small games library rooted in a shortage of third-party support made it impossible for the Jaguar to catch up, selling below 250,000 units. The system's 64-bit nature was also questioned by many. Its only add-on, the Jaguar CD, was released in 1995 and was produced in limited quantities due to the low install base of the system. The 32-bit Atari Panther, set to be released in 1991, was canceled due to unexpectedly rapid progress in developing the Jaguar.

The Sega 32X, an add-on console produced by Sega for the Genesis, was launched in November 1994. The Sega Neptune, a standalone version of the 32X, was announced but ultimately canceled. Sega failed to deliver a steady flow of games for the 32X platform. With customers anticipating the PlayStation on the horizon, and with Sega's more technically advanced Saturn already competing on the market in Japan, sales of the 32X were poor.

NEC, creator of the TurboGrafx-16 of the previous generation, entered the market with the PC-FX in late December 1994. The system had a 32-bit processor, 16-bit stereo sound, and video capability. Despite its impressive specs, it did not have a polygon processor and was marketed as a 2D and full motion video games console. The PC-FX game library was criticized for being low in quality, and having titles that relied more on animation than gameplay. Due to low expected sales it was never released outside of Japan.

Because of many delays in the release of the upcoming Nintendo 64, in 1995 Nintendo released the Virtual Boy, a supposedly portable system capable of displaying true 3D graphics, albeit in monochromatic red and black. Despite being marketed as a portable system, it is not actually portable in practice due to the lack of head strap. Also, because of the nature of its display, the system reportedly caused headaches and eye strain. It was discontinued within a year, with fewer than 25 games being released for it. Although it sold over 750,000 units, Nintendo felt that it was a failure compared to consoles such as the Super Nintendo, which sold over 20 million.

Aftermath of the fifth generation
By the end of the 1995 Christmas shopping season, the fifth generation had come down to a struggle between the Sony PlayStation, Sega Saturn, 3DO Interactive Multiplayer, and the upcoming Nintendo 64. The FM Towns Marty and Amiga CD32 had already been discontinued; the Jaguar and Genesis 32X were still on the market but were considered a lost cause by industry analysts; the Neo Geo CD had proven to appeal only to a niche market; and industry analysts had already determined that the yet-to-launch Apple Bandai Pippin was too expensive to make any impact in the market. Moreover, even the leading fifth generation consoles were still facing sluggish sales. Combined sales for the PlayStation, Saturn, and 3DO barely topped 1 million units for the Christmas shopping season, as compared to combined sales of 4 million for the Sega Genesis and Super NES. Focus groups showed that most children under 12 years old were equally happy playing on fourth generation consoles as they are playing on fifth generation consoles, making the fourth generation consoles more appealing to adults buying gifts for children, since they were cheaper. Industry analysts began putting forth the possibility that the fifth generation of consoles would never overtake the fourth generation in sales, and become superseded by a new generation of DVD player consoles before they could achieve mass acceptance.

1996 saw the fifth generation consoles' fortunes finally turn around. With the Saturn, PlayStation, and Nintendo 64 all showing dramatic increases in sales over the previous year, they claimed a combined 40% of the retail market for hardware and software, putting them in position to finally overtake the fourth generation consoles in 1997.

The Sega Saturn suffered from poor marketing and comparatively limited third-party support outside Japan. Sega's decision to use dual processors was roundly criticized, as this made it difficult to efficiently develop for the console. Sega was also hurt by the Saturn's surprise four-month-early U.S. launch of their console; third-party developers, who had been planning for the originally scheduled launch, could not provide many launch titles and were angered by the move. Retailers were caught unprepared, resulting in distribution problems; some retailers, such as the now defunct KB Toys, were so furious that they refused to stock the Saturn thereafter.

Due to numerous delays, the Nintendo 64 was released one year later than its competitors. By the time it was finally launched in 1996, Sony had already established its dominance, the Saturn was starting to struggle, and the 3DO and Jaguar had been discontinued. Its use of cartridge media rather than compact discs alienated some developers and publishers due to the space limits, the relatively high cost involved, and a considerably longer production time. In addition, the initially high suggested retail price of the console may have driven potential customers away, and some early adopters of the system who had paid the initial price may have been angered by Nintendo's decision to cut the price of the system by $50 six months after its release. However, the Nintendo 64 turned out to be a commercial success, particularly in the United States, where it sold 20.63 million units, nearly two thirds of its worldwide sales of 32.93 million units. It was also home to highly successful games such as Star Fox 64, Mario Kart 64, The Legend of Zelda: Ocarina of Time, The Legend of Zelda: Majora's Mask, Super Mario 64, GoldenEye 007, Banjo-Kazooie, and Super Smash Bros. While Nintendo 64 sold far more units than the Sega Saturn, Atari Jaguar, and 3DO combined, it posed no challenge to the PlayStation's lead in the market.

By 1997, 40% to 60% of American homes played on video game consoles. 30% to 40% of these homes owned a console, while an additional 10% to 20% rented or shared a console.

Changes in the industry
After the dust settled in the fifth generation console wars, several companies saw their outlooks change drastically.

Atari
Atari Corporation, which was not able to recover its losses, ended up merging into JTS Corporation in 1996. This caused the Atari name to virtually disappear from the gaming market until 1998, when Hasbro Interactive purchased the Atari assets from JTS for $5 million.

On May 14, 1999, Hasbro Interactive announced that all rights to the Atari Jaguar were released into the public domain, thus declaring the platform open; this allowed anyone to freely create and publish games for the Jaguar without endorsement or licensing from Hasbro Interactive. Since then, homebrew developers began to release uncompleted Jaguar games as well as several brand new titles to satisfy the system's cult following.

Sega 
Sega's loss of consumer confidence (coupled with its previous console failures) along with their financial difficulties, set the company up for a similar fate in the next round of console wars.

Home systems

Comparison

Other consoles
These consoles are either less notable, never saw a worldwide release, and/or sold particularly poorly, and are therefore listed as 'Other'.

Add-ons

Worldwide sales standings

From 1996 to 1999 (when the PlayStation, N64 and Saturn were the major 5th-generation consoles still on the market) Sony managed a 47% market share of the worldwide market, followed by Nintendo with 28% (with a percentage of that figure from the 16‑bit Super NES), while Sega was third with 23% (with a percentage of that from the Dreamcast).

Production of the Sega Saturn was discontinued in 1998. Its demise was accelerated by rumors that work on its successor was underway; these rumors hurt the systems' sales in the west as early as 1997. The N64 was succeeded by the GameCube in 2001, but continued its production until 2004; however, PlayStation production was not ceased as it was redesigned as the PSone, further extending the life of the console around the release of the follow-up PlayStation 2. The PlayStation console production was discontinued in 2006, the same year that the PlayStation 3 was released in Japan and North America.

Handheld systems

Handheld comparison

Other handhelds

Software

Milestone titles
 Castlevania: Symphony of the Night (PlayStation, Saturn) by Konami Computer Entertainment Tokyo and Konami is considered one of the best PlayStation games available, and a strong argument for the relevance of 2D games in an increasingly 3D market. The game is also credited with starting the Metroidvania genre, along with Super Metroid.
 Crash Bandicoot (PlayStation) by Naughty Dog and Sony Computer Entertainment (SCE) would go on to become Sony's de facto mascot along with Nintendo's Mario and Sega's Sonic the Hedgehog. The game featured a marsupial bandicoot named Crash and would prove to be one of the PlayStation's most successful titles.
 Dragon Warrior VII (PlayStation) by Heartbeat, ArtePiazza, and Enix was the number one best-selling title on the PlayStation in Japan, released in 2000. The game was the first main installment of Japan's national RPG series released in 5 years.
 Final Fantasy VII (PlayStation, PC) by Square Product Development Division 1 and Square is one of the PlayStation's most popular titles. It was the first game in the Final Fantasy series to make use of full motion videos (FMVs) and opened the door to the mainstream US market for Japanese-origin RPGs by SquareSoft. Final Fantasy became one of the biggest franchises in video gaming, with Final Fantasy VII in particular having several spin-offs known as Compilation of Final Fantasy VII, including two sequels (a film and an action adventure game), a prequel, and an ongoing remake series split into three parts.
 GoldenEye 007 (Nintendo 64) by Rare and Nintendo is a critically acclaimed game that helped make the first-person shooter a potential popular genre on consoles. The game has subsequently become credited alongside Shiny Entertainment's MDK for pioneering and popularising the now-standard inclusion of scoped sniper rifles in video games.
 Gran Turismo (PlayStation) by Polyphony Digital and SCE broke away from the mold of traditional arcade style racing games by offering realistic physics and handling as well as a plethora of licensed vehicles.
 The Legend of Zelda: Ocarina of Time (Nintendo 64) by Nintendo EAD and Nintendo is one of the most critically acclaimed games of all time and often listed as one of the greatest video games of all time. It transferred the playing mechanics of the previous 2D Zelda adventures to a 3D environment, with a third person perspective that could switch to first person view. It also featured mini-games involving archery, fishing, and horseback riding, and introduced the Z targeting system, which would become a mainstay in the series battles, with many other video games incorporating similar "lock-on" mechanics.
 Metal Gear Solid (PlayStation, PC) by Konami Computer Entertainment Japan and Konami received critical acclaim for its involved storyline, believable voice acting, and cinematic presentation, and is considered one of the best games of all time. The series remains a best seller for the PlayStation along with the series branching off to Xbox and other Nintendo consoles after many successes.
 The Need for Speed (3DO, PlayStation, Saturn, PC) by Pioneer Productions and Electronic Arts shot well ahead of prior racing simulators in graphics and realism, and spawned a number of sequels.
 Nights into Dreams... (Saturn) by Sonic Team and Sega was bundled with the Saturn's analog controller, which was almost essential to the gameplay. With its innovative gameplay and graphics, Nights, an exclusive title, aided in the selling of a number of Saturns.
 Paper Mario (Nintendo 64) received critical acclaim for its graphics, gameplay, and writing. It eventually led to more sequels starting with Paper Mario: The Thousand-Year Door which also garnered critical acclaim.
 Panzer Dragoon Saga (Saturn) by Team Andromeda and Sega is the highest-rated Saturn title on Game Rankings with a score of 92.87%, and has been cited as one of the greatest games ever made.
 Pokémon Red and Blue (Game Boy) by Game Freak and Nintendo was a critical and financial success when the games debuted on the Game Boy and putting another Nintendo franchise on the map. By the end of this console generation, the games sold about 31 million units worldwide.
 Pokémon Gold and Silver (Game Boy Color) also developed by Game Freak and Nintendo garnered critical acclaim from various gaming critics, are considered by many to be the best games in the Pokémon franchise.
 Resident Evil (PlayStation, Saturn, PC) by Capcom and Silent Hill (PlayStation) by Konami Computer Entertainment Tokyo and Konami helped popularize the survival horror genre on consoles. This genre continued to grow in the sixth generation of video games, and Silent Hill and Resident Evil went on to produce many successful sequels. Both have since been adapted for films.
 Sega Rally Championship (Arcade, Saturn, PC) by Sega AM5 and Sega was the first rally racing game. It broke new ground by incorporating different surfaces with different friction properties, and has been cited as one of the greatest racing games ever made.
 Star Fox 64 (Nintendo 64) by Nintendo EAD and Nintendo is the first Nintendo 64 game to use the Nintendo 64 Rumble Pak, which was bundled with the game. It was a success and sold 3 million copies worldwide.
 Super Mario 64 (Nintendo 64) by Nintendo Entertainment Analysis & Development (Nintendo EAD) and Nintendo is considered to be one of the greatest games of all time, particularly for its use of a dynamic camera system, the implementation of its 360-degree analog control, and open world design. Super Mario 64 is one of the best selling home console games of the era, selling 11.62 million copies worldwide.
 Super Smash Bros. (Nintendo 64) was a breakthrough IP for Nintendo, featuring characters from Nintendo owned franchises fighting in a party styled game. Super Smash Bros. has since been succeeded by 4 additional titles in the series.
 Tekken 3 (PlayStation) is considered not only to be the greatest installment of the Tekken series, but remains as one of the greatest fighting games of all time according to PlayStation Magazine. It has a Metacritic score of 96, and is the 12th highest rated game ever according to GameRankings. Its predecessor achieved similar feats until its succession, and the first game in the franchise was the first PlayStation game to sell over a million units.
 Tomb Raider (PlayStation, Saturn, PC) by Core Design and Eidos Interactive popularized many elements seen in later video games and spawned several very successful sequels. The main character, Lara Croft, was named the most recognizable female video game character by Guinness World Records.
 Tony Hawk's Pro Skater 2 (Nintendo 64, PlayStation, PC) by Neversoft and Activision garnered widespread critical acclaim and has been cited as one of the greatest games ever made.
 Virtua Cop (Arcade, Saturn, PC) by Sega AM2 and Sega introduced the use of 3D polygons to the light-gun shooter genre, paving the way for future light gun shooters like Namco's Time Crisis and Sega's The House of the Dead, and was a major influence on GoldenEye 007.
 Virtua Fighter (Arcade, Saturn, PC) by Sega AM2 and Sega created the 3D fighting game genre. The console port, which was nearly identical to the arcade game, sold at a nearly 1:1 ratio with the Saturn hardware at launch. The original arcade version also had a major influence on the PlayStation becoming a 3D-focused console.
 Virtua Fighter 2 (Arcade, Saturn, PC) by Sega AM2 and Sega was heralded at the time as "the ultimate arcade translation" and "the best fighting game ever". The title remains the highest selling Saturn game in Japan with 1.7 million copies.

See also

 Fourth generation of video game consoles
 Sixth generation of video game consoles
 The 3DO Company
 Playdia

Notes

References

 
History of video game consoles 05
05
.Consoles05
.Consoles05
1990s video games
2000s video games
Video game consoles05
Video game consoles05